Fan sourcing, a term first coined by Utah-based tech startup Needle, is a branch of crowd sourcing by which businesses outsource tasks and responsibilities to a specific group of brand advocates or fans.

Companies engaging in fan sourcing first determine who their fans are. Then the company engages with those fans and gives them opportunities to contribute by submitting their own ideas or working directly with customers through live chat services or other individualized customer engagement.

The goal of fan sourcing is to connect potential customers with fans who are knowledgeable and passionate about the products that those potential customers are interested in. This system is very different from its main alternative, call centers, because fans are typically very enthusiastic and excited to make product recommendations.

Those who use fan sourcing are motivated by the opportunities it provides for them to engage directly with their fans, and for the amount of work they are able to outsource at a much lower cost. Fans are intrinsically motivated to participate because they are already ardent supporters of the company. In many cases the fans may be rewarded monetarily or with free or discounted products.

Applications

Although Needle first coined the term fan sourcing, there are now at least five main companies offering solutions that offer a fan sourcing model for businesses: Needle, BzzAgent, Zuberance, BoldChat, LivePerson, and WildFire by Google. 

When potential customers browse on a company's e-commerce website, they have the opportunity to connect with a representative—what Needle calls a Needler—who answers product questions and gives them recommendations. "Essentially, [fan sourcing] puts your existing customer base—those who've used and know your product or service firsthand and are avid fans—to work as active brand advocates."

A case study of Skullcandy released in 2011 revealed an increase of 15% in average order value, 186% in return on investment, and 20% in overall conversion rate within one year of using fan sourcing. The study attributed these increases to the socialized, organic nature of fan sourcing, and the fact that it uses brand advocates rather than traditional customer service options such as FAQs or call centers.

Criticisms

Aside from the traditional criticisms of crowd sourcing as a whole, the main criticism of fan sourcing is that it overlaps too much with other similar terms such as crowd sourcing, social media marketing, and affiliate marketing. Overall, critics are unsure where to place fan sourcing in the digital marketing landscape.

See also
Citizen science
Clickworker
Crowdcasting
Crowd sourcing
List of crowdsourcing projects
Live support software
Open innovation
Social collaboration
Wisdom of the crowd
Web chat

References

Crowdsourcing